Carl Concelman (December 23, 1912 – August 1975) was the electrical engineer who, while working for Amphenol, invented the C connector and teamed up with Paul Neill of Bell Labs to invent the BNC connector and TNC connector.

See also
RF connector

References

American electrical engineers
1912 births
1975 deaths
20th-century American engineers
20th-century American inventors